Lehman College is a public college in New York City. Founded in 1931 as the Bronx campus of Hunter College, it became an independent college within CUNY in September 1967. The college is named after Herbert H. Lehman, a former New York governor, United States senator, philanthropist, and the son of Lehman Brothers co-founder Mayer Lehman. It is a senior college of the City University of New York (CUNY) and offers more than 90 undergraduate and graduate degree programs and specializations.

History

The Bronx Branch of Hunter College was first established in 1931.

The campus was the main national training ground for women in the military during World War II. For a decade before the entry of the United States in World War II, only women students attended, taking their first two years of study at the Bronx campus and then transferring to Hunter’s Manhattan campus to complete their undergraduate work. During the war, Hunter leased the Bronx Campus buildings to the United States Navy who used the facilities to train 95,000 women volunteers for military service as WAVES and SPARS.

When the Navy vacated the campus, the site was briefly occupied by the nascent United Nations, which held its first Security Council sessions at the Bronx campus for six months in 1946. From March to August 1946, the first American meetings of the Security Council were held in the Gymnasium Building where intercollegiate basketball, archery, swimming, and other sports have been played. During festivities marking the 40th anniversary of the United Nations in 1986, the Southern New York State Division of the United Nations Association presented the College with a commemorative plaque, now displayed outside the Gymnasium Building. The College participated in the United Nations’ 50th anniversary activities in 1995–96.

The process of separating Lehman College from its Hunter College-affiliated predecessor began in 1967, culminating in the establishment of an independent unit of the City University of New York on July 1, 1968. This new college, known as Herbert H. Lehman College or Lehman College, was established as a senior undergraduate college. The newly-established school was named after Herbert H. Lehman, the former, four-term governor of New York. Lehman College's founding president was Leonard Lief.

President Lief was succeeded by Ricardo R. Fernández in 1991. In 2016, José Luis Cruz, a former Provost and Vice President for Academic Affairs at California State University, Fullerton, was appointed as the third president of the College. On July 1, 2019, Jose Luis Cruz was appointed as the CUNY Executive Vice Chancellor and stepped down from the Lehman presidency. On February 21, 2021, the CUNY Board of trustees appointed Dr. Fernando Delgado to succeed interim president Daniel Lemons as the fourth president of the college.

The college closed like other CUNY campuses on March 11, 2020, in response to the coronavirus outbreak. Later, in April, the university released a study that concluded that the virus could be spread through a building's ventilation system. On October 5, 2020, 98% of classes were fully online due to the coronavirus pandemic. On May 26, 2022, after two years of conducting commencement ceremonies online due to the COVID-19 restrictions regarding mass gathering in NYC, Lehman held its first commencement ceremony post COVID-19 lockdowns.

Campus

Lehman has a 37-acre (15 hectare) campus with a combination of Collegiate Gothic and modern architecture, located near the Jerome Park Reservoir at 250 Bedford Park Boulevard West (250 West 200th Street). The school's architects were Kerr Rainsford, John A. Thompson, and Gerald A. Holmes; they had earlier designed the Archdiocesan Cathedral of the Holy Trinity in Manhattan's Upper East Side.

Lehman College houses a multimedia center in Carman Hall, comprising an acoustically designed recording studio, audio and video production control rooms, editing suites, student newsroom, media conversion room, graphics room, and "technology-enhanced" classrooms. BronxNet public access channel is also headquartered in Carman Hall, where many programs are produced including Bronx Talk and Open.

In 2012, Lehman dedicated its new $70 million Science Hall, a four-story building equipped with high-tech classrooms and laboratories, as well as a rooftop teaching and research greenhouse. In 2013, Science Hall was awarded a LEED platinum rating from the U.S. Green Building Council, the first CUNY building to earn the top green building rating. The structural engineers for this project was Leslie E. Robertson Associates (LERA).

The Lehman College Center for the Performing Arts is a professional theater which seats 2,310. The campus is also home to the Lehman College Art Gallery.

The Apex, Lehman College's post-modern style athletic and fitness facility, opened in 1994. Designed by architect Rafael Viñoly, the Apex stands in contrast to the original Gothic revival buildings that define the campus.

Lehman is located between Bedford Park Blvd and West 195th Streets in the Bronx, along Goulden Avenue and Paul Avenue as well as parts of Jerome Avenue The campus is served by the following methods of public transportation:

New York City Subway: the Bedford Park Blvd–Lehman College subway station at Jerome Avenue, served by the 4 train; and the Bedford Park Blvd station in the Grand Concourse, served by the B and D trains.

MTA Regional Bus Operations: Bx9, Bx10, Bx22, Bx26, Bx28 routes; The Bx1, Bx2, and Bx3 routes also run near the campus and have stops that are at walking distance.

Students
Students at Lehman College are from multiple ethnic and racial identities, multiple language backgrounds, various social classes, and diverse sexual orientations with many international students.

Enrollment (Fall 2018) Lehman College:
 Undergraduates: 12,639
 Graduate Students: 2,148
 Total: 14,787 students

Academics
Lehman College offers undergraduate and graduate programs in its Schools of Arts & Humanities, School of Education, School of Natural and Social Sciences, School of Business, School of Health Sciences, Human Services, and Nursing, and School of Continuing Education.

Macaulay Honors College at Lehman
The highly selective Macaulay Honors College at Lehman provides a full tuition scholarship, Apple laptop computer, and opportunities fund of $7,500 that can be used for various activities such as study abroad, reimbursements for internships or research, and service learning. Students in the honors college are required to take 4 seminars relating to New York City, maintain a 3.5 grade point average, and graduate within four years. They also must take four Lehman Scholars Program Seminars, or "LSP"s.

Lehman Scholars Program
The Lehman Scholars Program (L.S.P.) is designed for capable and highly motivated students who have the desire and ability to pursue a somewhat more independent liberal arts course of study. The program offers the advantages of a small, intimate college, including special courses, seminars, and individual counseling.

The Lehman Scholars Program offers several special features, first being that students are exempt from all Degree Requirements. They must, however, pass the CUNY Skills Assessment Tests to be admitted to the program and meet all course prerequisites and requirements for their major field.

The Lehman Scholars Program has its own requirements, which students must fulfill: a one-semester honors course in English composition and stylistics; two years of a foreign language at the college level or its equivalent; four honors seminars from any of four different academic areas: Fine and Performing Arts, Humanities, Natural Science, and Social Science; and a senior honors essay.

Students who enter the program with more than 30 credits may be considered for exemption from one seminar after consultation with the Program Director, Professor Gary Schwartz.

Mentors: Each student entering the program will be assigned to a faculty mentor in his or her field of interest. The mentor will advise the student in the areas of program planning and academic and career goals.

Application Procedure: Students who have earned 60 or fewer college credits may apply for either September, June, or January admission. They will be notified about their acceptance in time for the following semester's registration.

College Now
The College Now program allows selected high school students to take college courses. The program is offered during the spring, summer and fall semesters and the courses are taught at the main Lehman campus.

Freshman Year Initiative
The Freshman Year Initiative is a program involving "blocks" of classes, similar to many high schools, which allows for new and first year students to get to know each other and become familiar with the college environment.
All first-year students participate in the program, which promotes an interdisciplinary curriculum, faculty collaboration, and peer support. All students take mathematics and writing courses as well as a Freshman Seminar when they arrive to prepare them for the rest of their college courses.

Athletics
Lehman College teams participate as a member of the National Collegiate Athletic Association's Division III. The Lightning Bugs are a member of the City University of New York Athletic Conference (CUNYAC). Men's sports include baseball, basketball, cross country, soccer, swimming & diving, track & field, tennis and volleyball; while women's sports include basketball, cross country, soccer, softball, swimming & diving, tennis, track & field, volleyball, and cheerleading.

In 2012–13, the Lightning Bugs won CUNYAC Championships in men's swimming and diving and women's outdoor track and field. The school produced two All-Americans in women's outdoor track: Tobi Alli (100 m) and Jasmine Springer (Triple Jump).

Conference affiliations
 Eastern College Athletic Conference (ECAC)

Notable faculty
There are nearly 400 full-time faculty. Notable faculty include:

 Allison Amend (born 1974), Professor of English, novelist, and short story writer
 Michael Bacon, Associate Professor of Music, Lehman alumnus, and Emmy Award winning composer and songwriter; performs in the band the Bacon Brothers with his brother Kevin Bacon
 Jason Behrstock, Professor of Mathematics and Computer Science, Sloan Fellowship winner
 Laird W. Bergad, Distinguished Professor of Latin American and Puerto Rican Studies
 Jerome Charyn, former Professor of English, novelist, and film critic
 Eugene M. Chudnovsky, Distinguished Professor of Physics
 Jane K. Cleland, Lecturer in English
 Billy Collins, Professor Emeritus of English, United States Poet Laureate 2001–2003
 María Teresa Babín Cortés, Professor Emeritus of Latin American and Latino Studies
 John Corigliano, Professor of Music, Academy Award winner
 Joseph W. Dauben, Distinguished Professor of History
 J. Yellowlees Douglas, former Assistant Professor of English
 Martin Duberman, Distinguished Professor Emeritus of History
 Melvin Fitting, Professor Emeritus of Mathematics and Computer Science
 J. E. Franklin, former Lecturer in Education
 Dmitry Garanin, Russian-American Professor of Physics
 Nancy Griffeth, Professor of Mathematics and Computer Science
 Michael Handel, Professor of Mathematics
 Nicholas Hanges, Professor Emeritus of Mathematics (in memoriam)
 David Freeman Hawke, Professor Emeritus of History (in memoriam)
 William M. Hoffman, Associate Professor of Theatre (in memoriam)
 Linda Keen, Professor Emerita of Mathematics, Noether Lecturer
 Ádám Korányi, Hungarian-American Distinguished Professor Emeritus of Mathematics and Computer Science
 William Latimer, Professor of Health Sciences
 Robert Lekachman, Distinguished Professor Emeritus of Economics (in memoriam)
 John L. Locke, Professor of Language Science
 Ursula Meyer, Professor Emerita of Sculpture (in memoriam)
 Margot Mifflin (born 1960), Professor of English
 Joan Miller, former Professor of Dance and founder of the Dance program
 Melvyn B. Nathanson, Professor of Mathematics
 Matt O'Dowd, Associate Professor of Astrophysics
 Victor Pan, Distinguished Professor of Mathematics and Computer Science
 Shauneille Perry, former Associate Professor and Director of Theatre
 Lawrence Raphael, Professor Emeritus of Speech Science
 Stanley Renshon, Professor of Political Science
 Rob Schneiderman, Professor of Mathematics
 Raymond Smullyan, Distinguished Professor Emeritus of Mathematics and Philosophy
 Marilyn Sokol (born 1944), Distinguished Lecturer of Theatre
 Christina Sormani, Professor of Mathematics
 Dannielle Tegeder, Associate Professor of Art
 Concetta M. Tomaino, Adjunct Professor of Music 
 Lloyd Ultan, former Adjunct Professor of History
 Ruth Westheimer (born Karola Siegel, 1928; known as "Dr. Ruth"), German-American sex therapist, talk show host, author, professor, Holocaust survivor, and former Haganah sniper.
 Eric Wolf, former Distinguished Professor of Anthropology
 Eleanore Wurtzel, Professor of Biology, AAAS Fellow
 Naomi Zack, Professor of Philosophy

Notable alumni 

 André Aciman, writer, author of Call Me by Your Name, and professor at CUNY Graduate Center
 Debo Adegbile, Commissioner for the United States Civil Rights Commission
 Andrea Apolo, medical oncologist and researcher at the National Cancer Institute
 Gary Axelbank, journalist, disk jockey and TV personality based in The Bronx
 Michael Bacon, Emmy Award winning composer and songwriter, and Associate Professor of Music at Lehman College; performs in the band the Bacon Brothers with his brother Kevin Bacon
 Jacqueline Bishop, writer, visual artist and photographer from Jamaica and a professor at New York University
 Steven Contursi, businessman and numismatist
 Blondell Cummings, modern dancer and choreographer
 Rubén Díaz Jr., Borough President of the Bronx in New York City 
 Rubén Díaz Sr., member of the Democratic Party; represented the 32nd district in the New York State Senate from 2003 to 2017
 Jeffrey Dinowitz, politician who represents District 81 in the New York State Assembly 
 Brandon M. Easton, professional writer, screenwriter, and educator
 Christopher Emdin, professor in the Department of Mathematics, Science, and Technology at Teachers College, Columbia University
 Eliot Engel, U.S. representative for New York's 16th congressional district (1989–2021)
 Ailene Fields, sculptor and stone-carving teacher
 Nabie Foday Fofanah, Guinean sprinter, also known as the Speed Doctor
 Philip Foglia, prosecutor and Italian American civic rights activist  
 John Fox, former novelist and short-story writer 
 Joe Foy, Major League Baseball third baseman
 Eve Franklin, Democratic, represented Great Falls in the Montana Senate from 1991 through 2002 and served in the Montana House of Representatives from 2003 to 2007
 Lewis Gordon, philosopher, works in Africana philosophy, philosophy of human and life sciences, and phenomenology
 Micki Grant, singer (soprano), actress, writer, and composer
 Ramona Hernández, community leader, sociologist and historian, Professor of Sociology at the City College of New York, and director of the CUNY Dominican Studies Institute
 Andre Harrell, founder of Uptown Records, president/CEO of Motown Records, and the first half of the hip hop duo Dr. Jeckyll & Mr. Hyde
 Letitia James, Attorney General of New York since 2018
 Janet Kaplan, poet and professor
 Matt Kilcullen, Director of Athletics at Mercy College
 Woodie King Jr., theatre and film director and producer and founding director of the New Federal Theatre in New York City
 Jeffrey R. Korman, politician who was a member of the New York State Senate (33rd District) from 1990 until 1992 
 Graig Kreindler, painter and illustrator
 Don Leicht, visual artist who has worked as a painter and sculptor in the Bronx
 Kenney Mencher, painter and Associate Professor of Art and Art History at Ohlone College
 Steve Mirsky, writer for Scientific American and the host of the magazine's weekly science podcast, Science Talk
 Jacqueline Moody, writer, editor, and producer, and Founder and Chief Executive of YadaYadaCo
 Devon J. Moore, poet and author
 Jenn Morel, Dominican singer and songwriter
 Robert McCullough, former basketball player
 Pepón Osorio, Latino artist
 Ron Perlman, actor and voice actor, best known for playing the comic book character Hellboy in both Hellboy (2004) and its sequel Hellboy II: The Golden Army (2008), and Clay Morrow on the television series Sons of Anarchy (2008–2013).
 Richard Rakowski, entrepreneur, investor, and health care and energy consultant 
 Christopher "Kid" Reid, actor, comedian and former rapper, formerly known as Kid (shortened from his original MC name, Kid Coolout)
 Elizabeth Rodriguez, Puerto Rican actress who plays Aleida Diaz in the Netflix series Orange Is the New Black (2013–2019)
 Ediberto Roman, Professor of Law at Florida International University College of Law
 Jimmy Rowser, jazz double-bassist
 Murray Sabrin, professor of finance at Ramapo College and candidate for US Senate in 2018
 Abdel R. Salaam, choreographer, director, producer, mentor, and educator, and co-founder and director of Forces of Nature Dance Theatre
 Davi Santos, Brazilian-born actor best known for playing Sir Ivan, The Gold Ranger on the television series Power Rangers Dino Charge
 Ivan Seidenberg, former chairman and CEO of Verizon Communications Inc.
 José Enrique Serrano, member of the United States House of Representatives since 1990
 David L. Spector, cell and molecular biologist and professor at Cold Spring Harbor Laboratory (CSHL) and head of the Gene Regulation and Cell Proliferation program of the CSHL Cancer Center 
 Andrea Stewart-Cousins, Democrat who represents District 35 in the New York State Senate 
 Bob Stewart, jazz tuba player
 Andrea Stone, until 2019 the director of career services of the CUNY Graduate School of Journalism (later the Craig Newmark Graduate School of Journalism)
 Theodore Swetz, actor, theatre director, and educator and Head of Acting at UMKC Theatre at the University of Missouri-Kansas City
 Al Taylor, Democrat and Assembly member for the 71st District of the New York State Assembly
 Michelle Tokarczyk, author, poet, and literary critic and a professor of English and former co-director of the Writing Program at Goucher College 
 Celines Toribio, Dominican actress, model, and Spanish-speaking television personality
 Robert Torres Sabor Latino, hip hop artist and author
 Julius Penson Williams, African-American composer, conductor, and professor at the Berklee College of Music in Boston
 Lowell Hawthorne, Jamaican businessman, founder of Golden Krust Caribbean Bakery & Grill 
Karen Yu (born 1992), professional wrestler, also known as "Karen Q" and "Wendy Choo".

References

External links

 
 Official athletics website

 
1931 establishments in New York City
Educational institutions established in 1931
Colleges of the City University of New York
Jerome Park, Bronx
Universities and colleges in the Bronx
Universities and colleges in New York City